Events in the year 1882 in Norway.

Incumbents
Monarch: Oscar II

Events

 The 1882 Parliamentary election takes place.

Arts and literature

Births

January to June

6 January – Lise Stauri, educator (died 1949).
25 January – Conrad Christensen, gymnast and Olympic bronze medallist (d.1951)
4 February Birger Meidell, politician (d.1958)
5 February – Karl Ouren, Norwegian-American artist (d.1943)
19 February – Hans Ystgaard, politician and Minister (d.1953)
27 February – Nils Selmer Hauff, bookseller (d.1963)
11 March – Gunnar Kaasen, musher, delivered diphtheria antitoxin to Nome, Alaska in 1925, as the last leg of a dog sled relay that saved the city from an epidemic (d.1960)
12 March – Jakob Nilsson Vik, politician and Minister (d.1960)
2 May – Aagot Nissen, actress (d.1978)
5 May – Carl Alfred Pedersen, gymnast and triple jumper (d.1960)
20 May – Sigrid Undset, novelist, awarded the Nobel Prize in Literature in 1928 (d.1949)
10 June – Nils Økland, Esperantist and teacher
13 June – Hans Dons, naval officer and the first Norwegian to fly in Norway (d.1940)
25 June – Sigurd Asserson, civil servant (d.1937)
28 June – Peder Alsvik, politician (d.1964)
29 June – Ole Singstad, civil engineer in America (d.1969)

July to December
6 July – Arnstein Arneberg, architect (d.1961)
5 August – Trygve Schjøtt, sailor and Olympic gold medallist (d.1960)
13 August – Rolf Lefdahl, gymnast and Olympic silver medallist (d.1965)
20 August – Jens Isak de Lange Kobro, politician and Minister (d.1967)
25 August – Carl Fredrik Holmboe, engineer (d.1960)
30 August – Erling Kristvik, educator (died 1969).
12 September – Ragnvald Blix, illustrator (d.1958)
26 October – Per Bakken, Nordic skier (d.1958)
2 November – Oscar Engelstad, gymnast and Olympic bronze medallist (d.1972)
12 November – Nils Dahl, middle distance runner (d.1966)
16 November – Nils Opdahl, gymnast and Olympic gold medallist (d.1951)
23 November – Hans Johan Jensen, politician
30 November – Frithjof Olsen, gymnast and Olympic silver medallist (d.1922)
16 December – Olav Bjørnstad, rower and Olympic bronze medallist (d.1963)
25 December – Fredrik Rosing Bull, inventor/designer of improved punched card machines (d.1925)

Deaths
15 January - Aslak Reiersson Midhassel, politician (born 1798)
19 January - Rasmus Tønder Nissen, politician (born 1822)
22 March – Peter Wessel Wind Kildal, businessman (born 1814)
27 March – Jørgen Moe, bishop and author (born 1813)
10 April – Anton Wilhelm Brøgger, printer (born 1820)
27 June – Hans Paludan Smith Schreuder, missionary (born 1817)

See also

References